"Miss Sunshine" is a song by German dance band R.I.O. The song was written by Yann Peifer, Manuel Reuter, Andres Ballinas, Brad Grobler and Rob Janssen. It was released in Germany as a digital download on 13 March 2011.

Track listing
Digital download
 "Miss Sunshine" (Radio Edit) – 3:22
 "Miss Sunshine" (Video Edit) – 3:18
 "Miss Sunshine" (Extended mix) – 5:22
 "Miss Sunshine" (Club mix) – 5:44
 "Miss Sunshine" (LaSelva Radio Edit) – 3:57
 "Miss Sunshine" (Giorno Radio Edit) – 3:27
 "Miss Sunshine" (Giorno Remix) – 4:42

Credits and personnel
Lead vocals – Tony T.
Producers – Yann Peifer, Manuel Reuter
Lyrics – Yann Peifer, Manuel Reuter, Andres Ballinas, Brad Grobler, Rob Janssen
Label: Zoo Digital

Charts

Release history

References

2011 singles
2011 songs
R.I.O. songs
Songs written by Andres Ballinas
Songs written by DJ Manian
Songs written by Yanou